The 2012–13 3. Liga was the fifth season of the 3. Liga, Germany's third-level football league. The season began on the weekend of 21 July 2012 and ended with the last games on 18 May 2013, with a winter break held between the weekends around 15 December 2012 and 26 January 2013.

The league consisted of twenty teams: The teams placed fourth through seventeenth of the 2011–12 season, the worst two teams from the 2011–12 2nd Bundesliga, the three division champions of the 2011–12 Fußball-Regionalliga and the losers of the relegation play-off between the 16th-placed 2nd Bundesliga team and the third-placed 3rd Liga team.

Teams
At the end of the 2011–12 season, SV Sandhausen and VfR Aalen were directly promoted to the 2012–13 2nd Bundesliga. Sandhausen, having been a charter member of the 3rd Liga for its first four seasons, left the third level after five seasons overall, while Aalen celebrated their second consecutive promotion within twelve months. The two promoted teams were replaced by Alemannia Aachen and Hansa Rostock, who finished in the bottom two places of the 2011–12 2nd Bundesliga table and thus were directly relegated. Aachen gave their debut in the 3rd Liga, returning to the third level after thirteen seasons, while Rostock returned to the league after only one year in the second tier.

On the other end of the table, Rot-Weiß Oberhausen, FC Carl Zeiss Jena and SV Werder Bremen II were relegated to the 2012–13 Fußball-Regionalliga; Oberhausen entered the newly formed Regionalliga West, with Jena going to the Regionalliga Nordost and Werder Bremen reserves being admitted to the Regionalliga Nord. The three relegated teams will be replaced by the champions of the three 2011–12 Regionalliga divisions. Borussia Dortmund II from the Western division and Stuttgarter Kickers from the Southern Division returned after absences of two and three years respectively, while Hallescher FC from the Northern division will return to a national level of football for the first time since the 1991–92 2nd Bundesliga season and to third level after 18 years.

A further place in the league was available via a two-legged play-off between third-placed 2011–12 3rd Liga team Jahn Regensburg and 16th-placed 2011–12 2. Bundesliga sides Karlsruher SC. The tie ended 3–3 on aggregate and saw Jahn promoted via the away goal rule. Being a charter member of the 3rd Liga, Regensburg returned to the second level after eight years in the third tier of the German football league system; in turn, Karlsruhe gave their debut in the 3rd Liga after finishing a three-year 2nd Bundesliga spell, returning to the third level for the first time since the 2000–01 season in the process.

Stadiums and locations
One ground change occurred for the 2012–13 season, as Kickers Offenbach completed the re-building of their new ground, Sparda-Bank Hessen Stadium, at the same spot of their former home, Stadion am Bieberer Berg.

Personnel and sponsorships

Managerial changes

League table

Results

Season statistics

Top goalscorers
''Source: kicker (German)

Player awards

The following players were named as player of the month throughout the season.

 August:  Hakan Çalhanoğlu (Karlsruher SC)
 September:  Ondrej Smetana (Hansa Rostock)
 October:  Ondrej Smetana (Hansa Rostock)
 November:  Rouwen Hennings (Karlsruher SC)
 February:  Dirk Orlishausen (Karlsruher SC)
 March:  Dirk Orlishausen (Karlsruher SC)
 April:  Koen van der Biezen (Karlsruher SC)

Hakan Çalhanoğlu was voted as player of the season.

Team of the Year

The following players were named as the team of the year.

GK:  Patrick Platins (Arminia Bielefeld)
RB:  Philipp Klingmann (Karlsruher SC)
CB:  Jan Mauersberger (Karlsruher SC)
LB:  Stephan Salger (Arminia Bielefeld)
CB:  Manuel Hornig (Arminia Bielefeld)
RM:  Sebastian Hille (Arminia Bielefeld)
CM:  Dominic Peitz (Karlsruher SC)
CM:  Tom Schütz (Arminia Bielefeld)
LM:  Hakan Çalhanoğlu (Karlsruher SC)
CF:  Fabian Klos (Arminia Bielefeld)
CF:  Koen van der Biezen (Karlsruher SC)
Coach:  Stefan Krämer (Arminia Bielefeld)

References

External links
 3rd Liga on DFB page 

3. Liga seasons
3
German